From Fear to Eternity: The Best of 1990–2010 is a compilation album by British heavy metal band Iron Maiden, containing a selection of songs originally released on the eight studio albums from No Prayer for the Dying to The Final Frontier. The title is lifted from the 1992 single, "From Here to Eternity", although it is not featured in this release.

Background
The album was announced on 15 March 2011, to be released by EMI on 23 May, although this was later changed to 6 June. Unlike their previous compilation (Somewhere Back in Time), the release covered two CDs to encompass longer tracks, such as "Paschendale", although the price remained that of a single disc record.

As with Somewhere Back in Time, each track is sung by Bruce Dickinson rather than Blaze Bayley (who sang on The X Factor and Virtual XI), the band again opting to use later live versions of songs which originally featured other lead vocalists.

Artwork
The album cover was designed by Melvyn Grant, and serves to reference each relevant studio release. Three representations of Eddie appear, one dressed in Grim Reaper attire (as in Dance of Death), one atop the tank from A Matter of Life and Death – which is imprinted with the "Cross-Keys" symbol from The Final Frontier – and a large burning wicker man (the first single from Brave New World). The artwork also contains the tree from Fear of the Dark, the tombstone from No Prayer for the Dying, a large "X" on the tree trunk (representing The X Factor) and the twisted figures and burnt building structure from the Virtual XI cover.

Reception

Classic Rock described the album as representing "Gold from every era", claiming that, although "weighted towards the... last five studio albums", the "earlier singles... fight their corner remarkably well." The review also argues that some of the release's later songs "match anything from Maiden's 80s heyday."

In their July 2011 issue, Metal Hammer praised the compilation for doing "an excellent job of gathering the heartiest wheat over the last two decades", although deeming Blaze Bayley's absence from the album a "glitch" albeit "for the best."

Track listing

Personnel
Production and performance credits are adapted from the album liner notes.
Iron Maiden
Bruce Dickinson – vocals
Dave Murray – guitars
Janick Gers – guitars
Adrian Smith – guitars (except on "Holy Smoke", "Tailgunner", "Be Quick or Be Dead", "Afraid to Shoot Strangers", and "Bring Your Daughter... to the Slaughter")
Steve Harris – bass, keyboards
Nicko McBrain – drums
Additional musicians
Michael Kenney – keyboards on "Sign of the Cross", "Afraid to Shoot Strangers", "Fear of the Dark" and "The Clansman" (uncredited)
Production
Ade Emsley – mastering
Stuart Crouch – art direction, design
Melanie Hunter – art direction, design
Anthony Dry – art direction, design
Melvyn Grant – cover illustration
John McMurtrie – photography
Rod Smallwood – management
Andy Taylor – management

Charts

Certifications

References

2011 compilation albums
Iron Maiden compilation albums
EMI Records compilation albums
Heavy metal compilation albums